The 138th Street station was a station on the demolished IRT Third Avenue Line in the Bronx, New York City. It was originally opened on January 1, 1887 by the Suburban Rapid Transit Company, and had two tracks and one island platform. It was also served by trains of the IRT Second Avenue Line until June 11, 1940. A paid transfer was available to IRT Pelham Line trains at the underground Third Avenue – 138th Street station. This station closed on May 12, 1955, with the ending of all service on the Third Avenue El south of 149th Street.

References

IRT Second Avenue Line stations
IRT Third Avenue Line stations
Railway stations in the United States opened in 1887
Railway stations closed in 1955
1887 establishments in New York (state)
1955 disestablishments in New York (state)
Former elevated and subway stations in the Bronx
Mott Haven, Bronx